Athan is a Greek male given name, which means "eternal life" or "immortal". It can be a variant of Athanasios, and is of rising popularity among younger Greek parents. The name Athan may refer to:

People
Athan Catjakis (1931-2022), American politician
Athan Iannucci (born 1982), Canadian lacrosse player.
Athan Karras (1927–2010), American dancer and dance instructor
Athan Maroulis (born 1964), American singer and actor
Athan Theoharis (1936–2021), American historian

See also
Athanase
Athanasius (disambiguation)
Ethan
St Athan

References

Greek masculine given names